Frank Bauer may refer to:

 Frank X. Bauer (1862–?), Socialist member of the Wisconsin State Assembly
 Frank S. Bauer (1856–1936), Democrat member of the Wisconsin State Assembly